"Hypnotize Me" is a single by English new wave band Wang Chung, released on 5 May 1987 as the final single from their 1986 studio album, Mosaic. The single reached No. 36 on both US Billboard Hot 100 and the US Cashbox chart, their last US Top 40 to date. The song was also featured on the soundtrack to the movie Innerspace (1987).

The single's B-side, "Lullaby", was originally on the soundtrack to the film To Live and Die in L.A., which was recorded by the band.

Critical reception
Cash Box said that "Wang Chung's distinctive melodic and rhythmic instincts are on display here in this crafty, uptempo single." Cash Box also said that the song "has a hypnotic dance beat coupled with a bright pop sound" and "a spanking, martinet percussion [that] drives the tune from start to finish."

Track listing
 "Hypnotize Me" (Insomnia Mix)
 "Hypnotize Me" (Innerspace Mix)
 "Lullaby"

Music video

The music video for "Hypnotize Me" was directed by Oley Sassone filmed in black and white. The video is mainly set on lead vocalist Jack Hues wandering around an area hypnotized while singing the song. Nick Feldman is also seen in the background singing.

Charts

References

External links
 

1987 singles
Wang Chung (band) songs
Songs written by Jack Hues
Songs written by Nick Feldman